Chelone lyonii, the pink turtlehead or Lyon's shell flower, is a species of flowering plant in the family Plantaginaceae. It is native to wet areas of the southern Appalachian Mountains of the United States. A deer-tolerant perennial, it is hardy in USDA zones 3 through 8, and is recommended for shady and wet situations, although it can handle full sun. The unimproved species and a number of cultivars are commercially available, including 'Hot Lips' and 'Pink Temptation'. Its cultivar 'Armitpp02' is sold under the trade designation .

References

Plantaginaceae
Garden plants of North America
Endemic flora of the United States
Flora of Tennessee
Flora of North Carolina
Flora of Mississippi
Flora of Alabama
Flora of Georgia (U.S. state)
Flora of South Carolina
Plants described in 1813
Flora without expected TNC conservation status